Michael Edwards (born 1944) is an American actor and model.

Early life 
Edwards mother was Caroline Edwards. He has an older sister named Jeannie. His parents divorced when he was six months old, and claimed that his father left the family for a "buxom blond Texas heiress."

Career 
In 1962, Edwards enlisted in the U.S. Marine Corps and received his training at Parris Island. After his discharge from the service, he began his career as a model, appearing in TV commercials and magazine layouts. While modeling, he had a dialogue-free cameo in Play It as It Lays (1972) opposite Tuesday Weld. Edwards is pictured and interviewed in the book Male Model: The World Behind the Camera, published in 1979.

Edwards' most prominent acting role to date has been as Ted Gelber, Joan Crawford's lover in the 1981 film Mommie Dearest, with Faye Dunaway and Mara Hobel. He appeared briefly as "General John Connor" in Terminator 2: Judgment Day (1991).

Personal life 
He was married to a woman named Grace, with whom he had a daughter. 

Edwards dated Priscilla Presley on and off between 1978 and 1984. After they broke up, he wrote a book titled Priscilla, Elvis and Me (1988), in which he admitted being attracted to Presley's teenage daughter Lisa Marie. Lisa Marie reported in a 2003 interview with Playboy that Edwards would make drunken attempts to enter her room and be "inappropriate" with her.

Filmography

References

External links

American male film actors
American male models
Living people
Place of birth missing (living people)
1944 births